Manchester Memorial Hospital is a 249-bed community hospital located in central Manchester, Connecticut, an eastern Connecticut community about 10 minutes east of Hartford. The hospital opened in 1920, and was dedicated as a memorial to all Manchester residents who died during the First World War. In 1970, the hospital was rededicated as a memorial to veterans of all wars. The hospital operates a family medicine residency training program for newly graduated osteopathic physicians.

See also

List of hospitals in Connecticut

References

External links
Official Website

Hospital buildings completed in 1920
Hospitals in Connecticut
Manchester, Connecticut
Buildings and structures in Hartford County, Connecticut